James A. O’Reilly  (born November 13, 1955, Montreal) is a Canadian lawyer and Judge of the Federal Court of Canada. He was educated at Osgoode Hall Law School and was appointed to the Federal Court of Canada, Trial Division on December 12, 2002.

References

 James O'Reilly at the Federal Court of Canada

Judges of the Federal Court of Canada
1955 births
Living people
Officers of the Order of Canada
Lawyers from Montreal